Leonard A. Matanky (born October 26, 1958) is a prolific Modern Orthodox rabbi and Jewish leader in the United States. Based in Chicago, Illinois, Matanky is the co-president of the Religious Zionists of America, pulpit rabbi of Congregation K.I.N.S of West Rogers Park. and Dean of Ida Crown Jewish Academy and past president of the Rabbinical Council of America. He has written extensively on curriculum issues.

Biography
Matanky was born in Chicago in 1958. In 1978 he wrote Shabbat Games - Games for Youth Groups, published as a joint venture between American Zionist Youth Foundation Inc. and Bnei Akiva. In 1981, he received rabbinical ordination and a master's degree in Religious Education from Hebrew Theological College. That year, he began teaching Judaic studies  at Ida Crown Jewish Academy, a coeducational Modern Orthodox high school in Skokie, a suburb of Chicago, IL. Matanky subsequently earned a master's degree in Educational Administration from Loyola University in 1982, and a Ph.D. from the Graduate School of Arts and Sciences New York University in 1989. In 1994 he assumed the pulpit of Congregation K.I.N.S. in Chicago's West Rogers Park neighborhood. He was appointed Interim Dean of ICJA in 1996; he would later drop the "interim" title and become the Dean. In 2013, he succeeded Rabbi Shmuel Goldin as President of the Rabbinical Council of America. He had previously served as Vice-President of the RCA under Goldin.

Since 2017 Rabbi Matanky has served as co-President of Religious Zionists of America/Mizrachi. Prior to that he served two terms as president of the Chicago Rabbinical Council. Rabbi Matanky is on the boards of World Mizrachi, the Religious Zionists of Chicago and Camp Moshava. He is also co-Chairman of the Rabbinic Action Committee of the Jewish Federation of Metropolitan Chicago and serves on the rabbinic advisory committee of the YU  Torah MiTzion Kollel of Chicago.

Family
Matanky is married to Margaret Novick, with whom he has three sons and four daughters. His eldest child, Yaakov, died in a car accident in 2002 near Camp Moshava Wild Rose. The outdoor synagogue at the camp "Beit Yaakov Levi" was named in his memory.

References

Sources
 
 
 

1958 births
Living people
American Orthodox rabbis
Modern Orthodox rabbis
Rabbis from Chicago
20th-century American rabbis
21st-century American rabbis